The rosy pipit (Anthus roseatus) is a species of bird in the family Motacillidae.
It is found in Afghanistan, Bangladesh, Bhutan, China, India, South Korea, Myanmar, Nepal, Pakistan, Thailand, and Vietnam.

Gallery

References

External links 
 Birdlife International (English WIkipedia)

rosy pipit
Birds of Afghanistan
Birds of North India
Birds of China
rosy pipit
rosy pipit
Taxonomy articles created by Polbot